The field for the Kentucky Derby is limited each year to 20 horses, with two 'also eligibles' in case of a late withdrawal from the field. To determine eligibility, Churchill Downs developed the Road to the Kentucky Derby, which gives points to the top four finishers in specified races. The 2016 season consists of 34 races, 19 races for the Kentucky Derby Prep Season and 15 races for the Kentucky Derby Championship Season. Earnings in non-restricted stakes act as a tie breaker. Gun Runner finished first in the standings thanks to wins in the Risen Star Stakes and Louisiana Derby, then finished third in the Kentucky Derby. Nyquist, who finished second in the qualification standings, won the Derby.

Standings

 Entrants for Kentucky Derby in blue
 "Also eligible" for Kentucky Derby in green
 Sidelined/Inactive/No longer under Derby Consideration/Not Triple Crown nominated in gray
 Winner of Kentucky Derby in bold

Prep season

Note: 1st=10 points; 2nd=4 points; 3rd=2 points; 4th=1 point (except the Breeders' Cup Juvenile: 1st=20 points; 2nd=8 points; 3rd=4 points; 4th=2 point)

Championship series

First leg of series
Note: 1st=50 points; 2nd=20 points; 3rd=10 points; 4th=5 points 
The Sunland Derby was not eligible in 2016 because of quarantine restrictions associated with an outbreak of equine herpesvirus.

Second leg of series
These races are the major preps for the Kentucky Derby, and are thus weighted more heavily. Note: 1st=100 points; 2nd=40 points; 3rd=20 points; 4th=10 points

"Wild Card"
Note: 1st=10 points; 2nd=4 points; 3rd=2 points; 4th=1 point

Notes

See also
Road to the Kentucky Oaks

References

External links

Road to the Kentucky Derby, 2016
Road to the Kentucky Derby
Road to the Kentucky Derby